The División de Honor Femenina, currently known for sponsorship purposes as the Liga Iberdrola, is the top Spanish league competition for women's rugby union clubs. The league began in 2010 and consists of eight teams. Clubs are relegated to and promoted from Regional Championship's.

There was two competitions before establishment of División de Honor Femenina in 2010, Campeonato de España Femenino (1989–1997) and Copa de la Reina (1998–2010).

Competition

Format
The División de Honor comprises regular season and playoff. Regular season takes place between October and April, with every team playing each other twice for a total of 14 rounds. Points are awarded according to the following:
4 points for a win
2 points for a draw
1 bonus point is awarded to a team scoring 3 tries more than the opponent.
1 bonus point is awarded to a team that loses a match by 7 points or fewer

After the regular season, the top four teams play a championship playoff.

Promotion and relegation
The bottom team in the standings is relegated to Honor Division B, while the second-to-last plays a relegation playoff on neutral ground against Honor Division B runner up.

Past winners

Campeonato de España Femenino

Copa de la Reina

División de Honor Femenina de Rugby

Titles by team

See also
División de Honor de Rugby
Copa del Rey de Rugby

References

External links
 Official website

 

   
2
Spain
Sports leagues established in 2010
2010 establishments in Spain